The Village at Orange is a shopping mall located in Orange, California, formerly called The Mall of Orange and at first, officially (and later, popularly) the Orange Mall. The mall is currently anchored by Walmart on the north side.

History 
A standalone Sears store opened at the location, Tustin at Meats, in 1967.

In 1970, plans for a mall to be added to the Sears emerged. The center, on a 63-acre site, would cost $30 million and would be called the Orange Mall. The developer was Harry Newman, Jr., president of Newman Properties (Long Beach) and president of the International Council of Shopping Centers. The architect was Ainsworth & McClellan (Pasadena). The Broadway would be 167,500 sq. ft. and the Sears, 273,500 sq. ft. in size, with the mall's total size being 900,000 sq. ft., 80 retail stores, and parking for 4,700 cars. It was the first mall in Southern California with carpeting throughout it. The mall opened on August 16, 1971.

In 1977, the Woolworth's store closed and was replaced by a small JCPenney store.

The Broadway closed in 1996 due to the chain being purchased by Macy's and the site was torn down for a Walmart. The center completed a $57 million renovation in 2003. The densely populated trade area has over 1.6 million people residing in a  radius.

A Sprouts Farmers Market opened in July 2009, replacing the Linens 'n Things store that went out of business as part of the chain's nationwide store closings.

A renovation began in 2015.

On March 17, 2017, it was announced that JCPenney would be closing as part of a plan to close 138 stores nationwide. The store closed on July 31, 2017.

On January 29, 2021, it was announced that Sears would also be closing on April 18, 2021 as part of a plan to close 23 stores nationwide which left Walmart as the only traditional anchor left. Sears was the last original anchor in the mall.

References

External links 
 

Shopping malls in Orange County, California
Buildings and structures in Orange, California
Economy of Orange, California
Shopping malls established in 1971